The Int-Ball, also known as the JEM Internal Ball Camera, is an experimental, autonomous, self-propelled, and maneuverable ball camera that is deployed in the Japanese Kibō module of the International Space Station. It was delivered aboard SpaceX CRS-11 on June 4, 2017. The Int-Ball is intended to perform some of the photo-video documentation workload aboard the ISS.  The Int-Ball was designed by the Japan Aerospace Exploration Agency and is controlled and monitored by a team of JAXA ground controllers.

The Int-Ball naturally floats in the station's zero-gravity environment, allowing it to maneuver freely within the ISS. The unit shares many similarities with Earth-based drone motion control and drone camera systems. The Int-Ball's motion control system is capable of executing a rotation on any axis, and is also capable of overall movement in any general direction. The internal structural elements and outer body of the Int-Ball system were produced using 3D printing. The simulated "eyes" modeled on the exterior of the ball represent the direction of the "gaze" of the Int-Ball, which is in fact a single camera lens situated in the approximate center of the two "eyes".

The Int-Ball system was designed with the hope of reducing or eliminating the amount of time spent by astronauts aboard the ISS in photo-video documentation activities, which have been estimated to consume approximately 10% of the astronauts' work time.  The robotic photo-video documentation duties that the Int-Ball performs have been likened by some to the types of responsibilities that the fictional R2-D2 of the Star Wars movie series appeared to undertake.

See also
 CIMON, floating robot deployed on the ISS by Airbus
 Kirobo, interactive humanoid robot deployed on the ISS by JAXA
 Robonaut2, semi-humanoid robot deployed on the ISS by NASA

References

JAXA
International Space Station
Space photography and videography
2017 robots